Chen Wei-jao (born 15 November 1939) is a Taiwanese surgeon and academic administrator.

Early life and career
Chen was born in Taichū Prefecture on 15 November 1939. He studied medicine at National Taiwan University (NTU) and completed his residency at National Taiwan University Hospital. He became a lecturer at NTU and continued postgraduate study. Chen earned a DMS in 1973 at Tohoku University in Japan before completing a master's in public health at Johns Hopkins University in 1989. Chen was the lead surgeon in a groundbreaking September 1979 operation to separate conjoined twins. The twins were born with three legs between them and joined at the hip. The surgery was broadcast live on television. It was also the fourth successful separation of conjoined twins ever performed. Chen was named deputy director of the NTU Hospital in 1987 and became dean of the NTU college of medicine in 1991.

National Taiwan University presidency and subsequent career
Chen was the first elected president of National Taiwan University, and took office on 22 June 1993. Due to the 2003 SARS outbreak, Chen presided over NTU's first online commencement ceremony that year. In May 2004, Chen announced that the Gallery of University History was to be established in the old university library. He attended its dedication in June 2005 before stepping down as president. The Ministry of Education named Lee Si-chen Chen's successor as university president in June 2005. Chen was considered a candidate for vice president of the Republic of China in Ma Ying-jeou's 2008 presidential campaign. The Kuomintang confirmed Ma and Vincent Siew as its ticket. Chen later led the Institute for Biotechnology and Medicine Industry. Chen was convener of the presidential selection committee that named Kuan Chung-ming as NTU president in January 2018. Despite alleged conflicts of interest between committee members and Kuan, Chen supported Kuan selection on grounds of university autonomy, and the Ministry of Education confirmed Kaun's appointment in December 2018.

References

1939 births
Living people
Taiwanese surgeons
Scientists from Taichung
National Taiwan University alumni
Academic staff of the National Taiwan University
Presidents of National Taiwan University
Tohoku University alumni
Johns Hopkins University alumni
Taiwanese university and college faculty deans
Taiwanese hospital administrators